Laszlo Birinyi Jr.  is an investor, entrepreneur and the founder of Birinyi Associates, Inc. and Asset Management Arm.

Personal life
Birinyi  was born in Hungary but moved to Pennsylvania at the age of seven.  He graduated from the University of North Carolina at Chapel Hill, in 1966, with a major in history, and  has an MBA from the New York University Graduate School of Business.

Employment history
He  started his career in the investment industry as a trader, and then worked at Salomon Brothers starting from 1976 as an equity researcher and market analyst, later being promoted to head of Equity Market Analysis. In that position he constructed the Stock Week – a weekly commentary containing studies on fund flow, market structure, volatility etc. He helped establish the Salomon-Russell International Index.

Birinyi Associates
Birinyi launched Birinyi Associates in 1989, following his departure from Salomon Brothers. While founder and director of the firm, he still worked for Deutsche Bank Securities as Global Trading Strategist from 1988 until 2002.

Through his work at Birinyi Associates, Inc., he established a stock market research firm that analyzes the psychology and history of the stock market and the actions of investors in order to predict stock trends. He often makes contributions to Forbes (where he was also a columnist), Wall Street Journal, Barron's, BusinessWeek and Bloomberg Personal Finance.  He has appeared as a guest on CNBC and Bloomberg TV, and was also a panelist for Louis Rukeyser’s Wall $treet Week.

He is the author of The Master Trader: Birinyi's Secrets to Understanding the Market (2013), a book which, according to WorldCat, is held in 508  libraries and The Equity Desk – a book about stock market trading.

Philanthropic efforts
In 2001, Birinyi launched the Laszlo Birinyi Sr. Distinguished Professorship in Hungarian Culture at the University of North Carolina  in honor of his father. This $1 million endowment was “the first Hungarian culture professorship in the South, and it distinguishes Carolina as one of the few places in the United States where students may work with an expert in Hungarian studies.”

External links 
Birinyi Associates Inc.

References

Living people
American chief executives of financial services companies
New York University Stern School of Business alumni
American investors
American financiers
Chief executives in the finance industry
University of North Carolina at Chapel Hill alumni
People from Debrecen
Year of birth missing (living people)